Qum (also Kum, pronounced Gum) is a village and municipality in the Qakh Rayon of Azerbaijan.  It has a population of 1,954.

External links

References 

Populated places in Qakh District